Hulhudhaan is a 2014 Maldivian film directed by Aishath Fuad Thaufeeq. Produced by Mohamed Ali for Dark Rain Entertainment, the film stars Mariyam Majudha and Roanu Hassan Manik in pivotal roles. The film was released on 12 December 2014.

Cast 
 Mariyam Majudha as Sama
 Roanu Hassan Manik as Manik
 Ravee Farooq as Dr. Asif
 Ahmed Saeed as Rashad
 Ahmed Nashith as Eddy
 Mohamed Faisal as Maahir
 Mariyam Shakeela as Nurse 
 Ali Shazleem as Asif
 Adam Rizwee as Ihusaan

Release and reception 
The film was released on 12 December 2014. Only one showing of the film was premiered at Olympus Cinema. The film was later screened at the Venice Film Festival. 

The film opened to a positive response from critics. Ahmed Nadheem of Avas praised the direction by Thaufeeq and performance by lead actors. However, criticising the "quick end" of the film, Nadheem considered that the film is "award-worthy" and deserves more shows to be screened.

Accolades

References

External links 
 

2014 films
Maldivian drama films
Dark Rain Entertainment films
2014 drama films
Dhivehi-language films